These 103 genera belong to the subfamily Tropiduchinae, tropiduchid planthoppers.

Tropiduchinae genera

 Achilorma Metcalf & Bruner, 1930 i c g
 Alcestis Stål, 1862 i c g
 Alcumena Schmidt, 1932 i c g
 Alphesiboea Schmidt, 1932 i c g
 Amaclardea Muir, 1931 i c g
 Amapala Melichar, 1914 i c g
 Antabhoga Distant, 1912 i c g
 Arenasella Schmidt, 1932 i c g
 Athestia Melichar, 1914 i c g
 Barunoides Distant, 1912 c g
 Biruga Fennah, 1944 i c g
 Caffrommatissus Fennah, 1967 i c g
 Catullia Stål, 1870 i c g
 Catulliaria Muir, 1931 i c g
 Chasmacephala Fennah, 1945 i c g
 Chrysopuchus Gnezdilov, 2013 c g
 Cixiopsis Matsumura, 1900 i c g
 Clardeina Fennah, 1982
 Colgorma Kirkaldy, 1904 i c g
 Cyphoceratops Uhler, 1901 i c g
 Daradacella Fennah, 1949 i c g
 Daradax Walker, 1857 i c g
 Diambon O'Brien, 2010 i c g
 Dichoneura Lethierry, 1890 i c g
 Duriina Fennah, 1982
 Duriopsis Melichar, 1906 i c g
 Eilithyia Distant, 1912 i c g
 †Emiliana Shcherbakov, 2006 c g
 Eodryas Kirkaldy, 1907 i c g
 Eporina Fennah, 1982
 Eutropistina Kirkaldy, 1906
 Ficarasa Walker, 1857 i c g
 Fritzruehlia Schmidt, 1924 i c g
 Garumna Melichar, 1914 i c g
 Garumnella Wang, Liang & Webb, 2009 i c g
 Grynia Stål, 1862 i c g
 Hiracia Walker, 1857 c g
 Ingoma Fennah, 1954 i c g
 Isporisa Walker, 1857 i c g
 Isporisella Baker, 1927 i c g
 Jantaritambia Szwedo, 2000 c g
 Kallitambinia Muir, 1931 i c g
 Kallitaxila Kirkaldy, 1901 i c g
 Kazerunina Dlabola, 1974
 Lanshu Yang, Yang & Wilson, 1989 i c g
 Lavora Muir, 1931 i c g
 Leptotambinia Kato, 1931 i c g
 Leptovanua Melichar, 1914 i c g
 Leusaba Walker, 1857 i c g
 Lukabales Stroinski & Szwedo, 2015 c g
 Macrovanua Fennah, 1950 i c g
 Monopsis Spinola, 1839 i c g
 Montrouzierana Signoret, 1861 i c g
 Neocatara Distant, 1910 i c g
 Neommatissus Muir, 1913 i c g
 Neorudia Fennah, 1945 i c g
 Neotangiina Fennah, 1982
 Neotaxilanoides Men & Qin, 2011 i c g
 Neotylana Distant, 1909 i c
 Nesotaxila Fennah, 1971 i c g
 Nesotemora Fennah, 1956 i c g
 Neurotmeta Guérin-Méneville, 1856 i c g
 Numicia Stål, 1866 i c g
 Oechalina Melichar, 1914 i c g
 Oechalinella Wang, 2017
 Oligaethus Jacobi, 1928 i c g
 Ommatissus Fieber, 1875 i c g
 Ossoides Bierman, 1910 i c g
 Parahydriena Muir, 1924 i c g
 Paricana Walker, 1857 i c g
 Paricanoides Liang, 2003 i c g
 Paruzelia Melichar, 1903 i c g
 Patollo Szwedo & Stroinski, 2013 c g
 Peggioga Kirkaldy, 1905 i c g
 Peltodictya Kirkaldy, 1906 i c g
 Pseudoparicana Melichar, 1914 i c g
 Pseudotangia Metcalf, 1938 i c g
 Remosa Distant, 1906 i c g
 Rhinodictya Kirkaldy, 1906 i c g
 Rotunosa Distant, 1906 i c g
 Scenoma Fennah, 1969 i c g
 Sogana Matsumura, 1914 i c g
 Stacota Stål, 1859 i c g
 Stenoconchyoptera Muir, 1931 i c g
 Sumbana Lallemand & Synave, 1953 i c g
 Swezeyaria Metcalf, 1946 i c g
 Tambinia Stål, 1859 i c g
 Thymbra Melichar, 1914
 Tangiina Uhler, 1901 i c g
 Tangiopsis Uhler, 1901 i c g
 Tangyria Fennah, 1969 i c g
 Teramnon Melichar, 1914 i c g
 Thaumantia Melichar, 1914 i c g
 Togoda Melichar, 1906 c g
 Trienopa Signoret, 1860 i c g
 Tropiduchus Stål, 1854 i c g
 Trypetimorpha Costa, 1862 i c g
 Turneriola China, 1923 i c g
 Ubis Fennah, 1945 i c g
 Vanua Kirkaldy, 1906 i c g
 Vanuoides Metcalf, 1938 i c g
 Varma Distant, 1906 i c g
 Zema Fennah, 1956 i c g

Data sources: i = ITIS, c = Catalogue of Life, g = GBIF, b = Bugguide.net

References

Tropiduchinae